The Book of Nature within the relationship between religion and science is a religious and philosophical concept originating in the Latin Middle Ages which views nature as a book to be read for knowledge and understanding. There also was a book written by Conrad of Megenberg in the 14th century with the original German title of "Buch der Natur". Early theologians believed the Book of Nature was a source of God's revelation to mankind: when read alongside sacred scripture, the "book" of nature and the study of God's creations would lead to a knowledge of God himself. This type of revelation is often referred to as "general revelation." The concept corresponds to the early Greek philosophical belief that man, as part of a coherent universe, is capable of understanding the design of the natural world through reason. The concept is frequently deployed by philosophers, theologians, and scholars.

The first known use of the phrase was by Galileo. He used the phrase when he wrote of how "the book of nature [can become] readable and comprehensible."

Origins
From the earliest times in known civilizations, events in the natural world were expressed through a collection of stories concerning everyday life. In ancient times, a mortal world existed alongside an upper world of spirits and gods acting through nature to create a unified and intersecting moral and natural cosmos. Humans, living in a world that was acted upon by free-acting and conspiring gods of nature, attempted to understand their world and the actions of the divine by observing and correctly interpreting natural phenomena, such as the motion and position of stars and planets. Efforts to interpret and understand divine intentions led mortals to believe that intervention and influence over godly acts were possible—either through religious persuasions, such as prayer, gifts, or through magic, which depended on sorcery and the manipulation of nature in order to bend the will of the gods. Knowing divine intentions and anticipating divine actions through the manipulation of the natural world was believed achievable and the most effective approach. Thus, mankind had a reason to know nature.

Around the sixth century BCE, man’s relationship with the deities and nature began to change. Greek philosophers, such as Thales of Miletus,  no longer viewed natural phenomena as the result of free-acting, omnipotent gods. Rather, natural forces resided within nature, which was an integral part of a created world, and appeared under certain conditions that had little to do with the manipulative tendencies of personal deities. Furthermore, the Greeks believed that natural phenomena occurred by “necessity” through intersecting chains of “cause” and “effect.” Greek philosophers, however, lacked a technical vocabulary to express such abstract concepts as “necessity” or “cause” and consequently co-opted words available in the Greek language to refer metaphorically to the new philosophy of nature. Accordingly, the Greeks conceptualized the natural world in more specific terms that aligned with a new philosophy that viewed nature as immanent in which natural phenomena occurred by necessity.

In Christianity early Church Fathers appeared to use the idea of a book of nature, librum naturae, as part of a two-book theology: "Among the Fathers of the Church, explicit references to the Book of Nature can be found, in St. Basil, St. Gregory of Nyssa, St. Augustine, John Cassian, St. John Chrysostom, St. Ephrem the Syrian, St. Maximus the Confessor."

The Aristotelian corpus
The Greek concept of nature, metaphorically expressed in the Book of Nature, gave birth to three philosophical traditions that became the wellspring for natural philosophy and early scientific thinking. Among the three traditions inspired by Plato, Aristotle, and Pythagoras, the Aristotelian corpus became a pervasive force in natural philosophy until it was challenged in early modern times.  Natural philosophy, which encompassed a body of work whose purpose was to describe and explain the natural world, derived its foremost authority in the medieval era from Christian interpretations of Aristotle, in which his natural philosophy was viewed as a doctrine intended to explain natural events in terms of readily understood causes. Aristotle considered the purely abstract mathematical constructs by Plato and Pythagoras inadequate for knowing the natural world because of their inability to provide causal explanations.

Aristotle reasoned that knowledge of natural phenomena was derived by abstraction from a sensory awareness of the natural world—in short, knowledge was obtained through sensory experience.  A world constructed by abstract ideas alone could not exist. Furthermore, the structures inherent in nature are revealed through this process of abstraction, which may result in metaphysical principles that can be used to explain a variety of natural phenomena, including their causes and effects. Events that have no identifiable cause happen by chance and reside outside the boundaries of natural philosophy. The search for causal explanations became a dominant focus in natural philosophy whose origins lay in the Book of Nature as conceived by the earliest Greek philosophers.

Rediscovering God
The Greeks succeeded in constructing a view of the natural world in which all references to mythological origins and causes were removed. By abandoning ancient ties to free-acting, conspiring gods of nature, Greek philosophers inadvertently left the upper world vacant. The new philosophy of nature made unseen mythological forces irrelevant. While some philosophers drifted toward atheism, others worked within the new philosophy to reconstitute the concept of a divine being. Consequently, the new outlook toward the natural world inspired the belief in a supreme force that was compatible with the new philosophy—in other words, monotheistic. However, the path leading from nature to rediscovering a divine being was uncertain. Once again, the Book of Nature was consulted, and it was Aristotle who interpreted its spoken text.

The belief in causality in nature implied an endless, interconnected chain of causation acting upon the natural world. It is presumed, however, that Greek thought denied the existence of a natural world where causality was infinite, which gave rise to the notion of “first cause," upon which the order of other causes must rely. The pathway to heaven became clear: “the First Cause is also the Prime Mover of the world; and, since motion is a fact revealed by the senses, the Prime Mover must exist by necessity, a being unable to be otherwise than it is. Consequently, it is also perfect and thus the ultimate object of desire, or the ‘Supreme Good’. And, since nature operates for a purpose, the Prime Mover must also be intelligent. Being eternal it is divine…” and we now know of it as “God.”  The ultimate cause, or source, of all natural phenomena occurring in the natural world, had been discovered. There was but one God, and He has created all that resides in the Book of Nature.

Christianity and Greek culture
The first contact between Christianity and Greek culture occurred in Athens in the first century A.D. Christian theologians viewed the Greeks as a pagan culture whose philosophers were obsessed with the wonders of the material, or the natural world. Observation and explanation of natural phenomena were of little value to the Church. Consequently, early Christian theologians dismissed Greek knowledge as being perishable in contrast to true knowledge derived from sacred Scripture. Yet, the Church Fathers struggled with questions concerning the natural world and its creation that reflected the concerns of Greek philosophers. Despite their rejection of pagan thinking, the Church Fathers benefited from Greek dialectic and ontology by inheriting a technical language that could help express solutions to their concerns.  As Peter Harrison observes, “in the application of the principles of pagan philosophy to the raw materials of a faith, the content of which was expressed in those documents which were to become the New Testament, we can discern the beginnings of Christian theology.”  Eventually, Church Fathers would recognize the value of the natural world because it provided a means of deciphering God’s work and acquiring true knowledge of Him. In other words, God has infused the material world with symbolic meaning, which if understood by man, reveals higher spiritual truths.  For the moment, however, the Church’s indifference to nature would prevail in ecclesiastical matters.

What the Church Fathers needed, and did not inherit from the early Greek philosophers, was a method of interpreting the symbolic meanings embedded in the material world. According to Harrison, it was Church Father Origen in the third century who perfected a hermeneutical method that was first developed by the Platonists of the Alexandrian school by which the natural world could be persuaded to give up hidden meanings.  “This universal hermeneutic was to provide interpretive strategies for dealing with both texts and objects in the physical world. It lay at the foundation of the ‘symbolist mentality’ of the middle ages, and was the sine qua non of the medieval image of the ‘book of nature’."

For their part, the Platonists believed the visible world reveals knowledge about the invisible world, which in turn, reveals the truth and knowledge of the Creator. Origen then demonstrated how the natural world could be made intelligible to man through a process that exposed the spiritual realities which the material world signified. Thus, if the natural world was created to minister to the physical and spiritual needs of mankind, reading the Book of Nature ensured both needs could be fulfilled, in part through what the visible world signifies.  The importance of reading the Book of Nature alongside sacred Scripture became evident because references to the natural world in the sacred text were unintelligible unless the reader was knowledgeable about the Book of Nature in order to understand these references and interpret their meaning. However, whereas the Book of Nature served Scripture well, it lacked internal order and discernible relationships between the objects it represented thereby reducing nature to an inchoate and unintelligible language. The Book of Nature required substantial editing and revision, which would not occur for another nine hundred years.

Rediscovering the natural world
By the twelfth century, a renewed study of nature was beginning to emerge along with the recovered works of ancient philosophers, which were being translated from Arabic and original Greek. The writings of Aristotle were among the most important of the ancient texts and had a remarkable influence among intellectuals. Interest in the material world, in conjunction with the doctrines of Aristotle, elevated sensory experience to new levels of importance. Earlier teachings concerning the relationship between God and man’s knowledge of material things were giving way to a world in which knowledge of the material world conveyed the knowledge of God. Whereas scholars and theologians once held a symbolist mentality of the natural world as expressive of spiritual realities, intellectual thinking now regarded nature as a “coherent entity which could be systematically investigated by the senses. The idea of nature is that of a particular ordering of natural objects, and the study of nature is the systematic investigation of that order.”

The notion of order in nature implied a structure to the physical world whereby relationships between objects could be defined. According to Harrison, the twelfth century marked an important time in the Christian era when the world became invested with its own patterns of order—patterns based on networks of likeness or similarities among material things, which served to determine the character of a pre-modern knowledge of nature. While God has made all things that reside in the Book of Nature, certain objects in nature share similar characteristics with other objects, which delineates the sphere of nature and “establishes the systematising principles upon which knowledge of the natural world is based.”  Thus, the Book of Nature was acquiring a table of contents and its subject matter could now be indexed. No longer a catalogue of religious symbols, the Book of Nature attained a unified and coherent whole in which the meaning of its contents was discernible.  Indeed, nature could now be read like a book.

Reading the Book of Nature
Scholars, natural philosophers, emerging naturalists, and other readers of the new Book of Nature enthusiastically renewed their investigation of the natural world. Alongside sacred Scripture, the Book of Nature also became a font of divine revelation and a source of knowledge of God. This also implied that for mankind, nature itself became a new authority concerning the divine. There now existed two ways of knowing God—two texts, or two "books"—sacred Scripture and the Book of Nature, and two separate authorities, which was disquieting to many contemporary observers. Which textual authority took precedence? How would inconsistencies between the two texts be resolved? Who would mediate between the two books and exercise final interpretive authority? As Harrison points out, the exegesis of the Book of Nature became a critical concern, especially to the Church.  Religious indifference to the material world, which had survived for centuries, came to an end by the thirteenth century. Interest in nature by Church Fathers would transform the study of nature into a theological enterprise. The Book of Nature became a bestseller among clerics and theologians anxious for its knowledge in their search for divine truth and concern for preserving and strengthening the authority of the Church in all matters ecclesiastical, which now included the Book of Nature.

Two books – two worlds?
By the sixteenth century, discord between traditional authorities was beginning to surface. Ancient texts and doctrines were disputed, knowledge of the natural world was found to be incomplete, interpretation of Scripture was being challenged, and Greek philosophy, which helped draft the Book of Nature, and Scripture were viewed as fundamentally opposed.  The Book of Nature was acquiring greater authority, for its wisdom and as an unmediated source of natural and divine knowledge. As a source of revelation, the Book of Nature remained moored to the Christian faith and occupied a prominent location in Western culture alongside sacred Scripture. The concern that these two books would eventually collide, however, was becoming increasingly evident among scholars, natural philosophers, and theologians, who viewed with trepidation the possibility of two separate and incompatible worlds—one determined to possess nature, and the other determined to uphold Christian faith. The social and religious transformations already underway in European society and western culture would shove these two diverging worlds even farther apart. The purpose for which the Book of Nature was written and the emerging confrontation between natural science and religion over the locus of authority on matters of truth and ideological certitude were fundamental issues that mankind, perched on the threshold of modernity, would be forced to contemplate.

See also 
 The Assayer

Notes

Bibliography

Evernden, Lorne Leslie Neil. The Social Creation of Nature. Baltimore, MD: Johns Hopkins University Press, 1992.

Further reading
Binde, Per. “Nature in Roman Catholic Tradition.” Anthropological Quarterly 74, no. 1 (January 2001): 15-27.
Blackwell, Richard J. Galileo, Bellarmine, and the Bible. Notre Dame: University of Notre Dame Press, 1991.
Eddy, Matthew, and Knight, David M. Introduction. Natural Theology. By William Paley. 1802. New York: Oxford University Press, 2006. ix-xxix.
Eisenstein, Elizabeth L. The Printing Revolution in Early Modern Europe. New York: Cambridge University Press, 2005.
Findlen, Paula. Possessing Nature: Museums, Collecting, and Scientific Culture in Early Modern Italy. Berkeley: University of California Press, 1996.
Henry, John. The Scientific Revolution and the Origins of Modern Science. New York: Palgrave Macmillan, 2008.
Kay, Lily E. Who Wrote the Book of Life?: A History of the Genetic Code. Stanford, CA: Stanford University Press, 2000.
Kosso, Peter. Reading the book of nature: an introduction to the philosophy of science. Cambridge: Cambridge University Press, 1992.
Nelson, Benjamin. “Certitude, and the Books of Scripture, Nature, and Conscience.” In On the Roads to Modernity: Conscience, Science, and Civilizations. Selected Writings by Benjamin Nelson, edited by Toby E. Huff. Totowa, N.J.: Rowman and Littlefield, 1981.

History of science
Religion and science
God in Christianity
Creationism
Medieval philosophy